Lake Bant, or Banter See in German, is an artificial lake in the North Sea port city of Wilhelmshaven in north-west Germany. It was originally part of the harbour complex created by enclosing part of Jade Bight bordering the city's waterfront for military and industrial use. It used to contain naval facilities, including a submarine base. Now separated from the port, it is used mainly for recreation and research. It is surrounded by parkland, recreational facilities, up-market housing, research institutes and company offices.

See also
 Lake Bant tern colony

References

Wilhelmshaven
Ports and harbours of the North Sea
Bant
German Navy bases
Bant